is a manufacturer of tofu and eco-friendly soy-based foods located in Chuo Ward, Tokyo. It has six retail outlets and operates a fleet of 130 sales trucks in the Kanto and Tokai regions of Japan.

Company summary

Somenoya is a manufacturer of tofu and eco-friendly soy-based foods. It was founded in 1862 during Japan’s Edo period.

Somenoya applies ancient Edo principles, including the use of Japanese soybeans and nigari and additive-free ingredients.
Most business is done by hikiuri, a traditional system of roaming sales. In the old days, hikiuri tofu peddlers walked around towns and villages carrying their wares in large wooden baskets. Modern vendors travel in small, refrigerated trucks.

Mission statement

The Somenoya philosophy is “Soybeans Save the World. The company goal is to contribute to a more sustainable society and to "make the world a better place for future generations." A core aspect of that goal is the promotion of a cultural shift from environmentally destructive, meat-based proteins to proteins derived from plants (principally soybeans).

The current CEO, Hanjiro VIII, won the first annual Japan Vegetarian Award Meat Free Monday Prize from the Japan Vegetarian Society (NPO) in February, 2016. He received the award for his ongoing "Soybeans Save the World" lecture series, which he created to spread consciousness on vegetarianism and environmental issues.
 
Somenoya is an official sponsor of Meat free Monday Japan, the Japanese sister campaign of the international movement spearheaded by Sir Paul McCartney.

Timeline History

1862: Hanjiro I begins making and selling tofu in Toride City, Ibaraki, Japan under the company name Yamahan Yorozuya. 

1907: Hanjiro II changes the company name to Hanjiro.

1932: The company splits into two organizations, Hanjiro and Someno. 

2004: Hanjiro VIII inherits the company and changes the name to Somenoya. The first Somenoya retail shop opens in the Boxhill department store adjacent to the train station in Toride City. 

2005: The Hanjiro lines merge under the name Somenoya.

2006: A retail sales branch and distribution centre opens beside the Toride factory.

2007: The Chiba City retail sales branch and distribution centre opens in Chiba Prefecture.

2008: The Saitama City retail sales branch and distribution centre opens in Saitama Prefecture. 

2009: The Toride factory earns ISO 9001 certification.

2011: Somenoya headquarters moves from Toride to Tokyo. The Adachi Ward retail sales branch and distribution centre opens in Tokyo.

2013: The Yokohama retail sales branch and distribution centre opens in Kanagawa Prefecture. A second factory opens in Shimada City, Shizuoka Prefecture. Yaizu City retail sales branch and distribution centre opens in Shizuoka Prefecture.

2015: CEO Atsuto Ono inherits the title of Hanjiro VIII.

2016: The Shizuoka factory receives HACCP certification.

Gallery

See also
 List of vegetarian and vegan companies

References

Toride-city Board of Education “The report of repair work of Someno’s Honjin”(Japanese)
Ishin KK“Venture Tsushin On-line”(Japanese)
KK Keieijyuku“BOSS online”(Japanese)

External links
 Somenoya website (Japanese)
Somenoya English website
Japan Vegetarian Society website

Japanese companies established in 1862
Food and drink companies based in Tokyo
Vegetarian companies and establishments
Japanese brands